Anthony Charles Shackleton Pigott (born 4 June 1958), was educated at Harrow School and is a former English cricketer, who played in one Test for England in 1984, when he was called up as an emergency replacement in New Zealand. He was playing provincial cricket there at the time of an injury crisis, although according to Martin Williamson of Cricinfo, Pigott "would not have been high in the selectors' minds".

At that time, Pigott was a fast bowler of some promise, playing in Wellington, New Zealand, for experience during the traditional winter's break from the domestic game in his homeland. Pigott was due to get married, and the surprise call-up meant he had to postpone his wedding to represent his country. Pigott got off to a good start, taking a New Zealand wicket with only his seventh delivery. However, with a depleted side, England were twice bowled out for less than 100, and lost the match within twelve hours of actual playing time.

Pigott played first-class cricket for Sussex and later for Surrey. His initial three first-class wickets in 1978, came courtesy of a hat-trick for Sussex against Surrey. However, his career became blighted by back injuries and petered out altogether after his move to play for Surrey. In total, he took 672 first-class wickets at marginally under 31 each. His top score was 104 not out, his only first-class ton. After turning to coaching Surrey's second XI, he returned as Chief Executive at Sussex following an acrimonious coup. "I'm a Sussex boy and it horrifies me to see the club in such a state with no one prepared to take the blame for it," added Pigott.

He became unhappy with the vagaries of his responsibilities, and resigned for personal reasons in 1999.

See also
One-Test wonder

References

External links

1958 births
Living people
People educated at Harrow School
England Test cricketers
English cricketers
Surrey cricketers
Sussex cricketers
Wellington cricketers
People from Fulham
D. H. Robins' XI cricketers